Bay Plaza Shopping Center is a shopping center on the south side of Co-op City, Bronx, New York City.  In addition to various department stores and shops, such as Macy's, JCPenney, Staples, and Old Navy, it has a multiplex movie theater, several restaurants, a fitness club, and some office space. Constructed from 1987 to 1988 by Prestige Properties, the shopping center is located between Bartow and Baychester Avenues, just outside Sections 4 and 5 of Co-op City, on an open lot that was the site of the Freedomland U.S.A. amusement park between 1960 and 1964.  The Bay Plaza Shopping Center is the largest shopping center in New York City. Since opening over 25 years ago, it has become extremely successful, the center claims to hold some of the highest performing stores on a per-square-foot basis for many national retailers.

Expansion 

The Mall at Bay Plaza is expansion project of Bay Plaza Shopping Center. The  center encloses a fashion mall with stores like JCPenney, Macy's and over 100 specialty stores and food court as well as a 1,800-car parking garage.  It opened on August 14, 2014. The Mall at Bay Plaza is the first enclosed anchored fashion mall opened in the New York City area in almost 40 years after Queens Center opened in 1973. The developer hired the Los Angeles-based architectural firm Altoon & Porter Architects as the builder, and also hired Aurora Contractors — a New York-based firm — as Construction Manager.

The mall, which is located at the Hutchinson River Parkway and I-95, has helped grow what is already the city’s largest shopping center (now ) to approximately  upon its summer 2014 completion. A new , three-level Macy’s and the existing  JCPenney anchors the development, which also has a 1,800-car parking garage. An H&M store, the first in the borough, opened in the mall. It created more than 2,000 construction jobs and 1,700 permanent jobs. It costs .

References

External links
Mall at Bay Plaza

Shopping malls in New York City
Shopping malls established in 1988
Commercial buildings in the Bronx
Tourist attractions in the Bronx
1988 establishments in New York City
Co-op City, Bronx